Arthur Fong Jen  (born 24 May 1964) is a Singaporean banker and former politician. A former member of the country's governing People's Action Party (PAP), Fong was a Member of Parliament representing West Coast Group Representation Constituency (GRC) from 2001 to 2015.

Career
Fong is a private banker, and remained in the profession throughout his three-term tenure in politics.

Political career 
Fong represented West Coast GRC in the Parliament of Singapore as a Member of Parliament from 2001 to 2015, and stepped down during the 2015 general elections. Fong's party, the PAP, enjoyed a walkover for the constituency in the 2001 and 2006 general elections, but the constituency was contested in 2011 by the Reform Party led by Kenneth Jeyaretnam. Jeyaretnam was defeated by a vote of 66.57% in favour of the PAP candidates, including Fong. Following the election, Fong was returned as the representative for Clementi, and continued his third term in Parliament. He stepped down as MP for Clementi before the 2015 elections in September of that year.

Personal life
Fong's father, Andrew Fong, was a former MP of Stamford constituency from 1963 to 1976 and  Kampong Chai Chee from 1976 to 1988. His father was also formerly the Minister of State for Culture.

Awards and recognition
In 2014, the Institute of Banking and Finance awarded him an IBF fellowship, in recognition of his work in the financial industry. That year, Fong was also appointed honorary Commander of the Most Excellent Order of the British Empire for his service in public office.

References

External links
 Arthur Fong's profile on the Singapore Parliament website
 http://www.channelnewsasia.com/news/specialreports/parliament/bill-reflects-singapore-s-resolve-to-fig/774200.html   Bill on Terrorism Suppression of Financing And Anti Money Laundering Act Amendment

Anglo-Chinese School alumni
People with albinism
Members of the Parliament of Singapore
People's Action Party politicians
Singaporean Christians
1964 births
Living people
University of Oregon alumni